Kirk von Ackermann ( – 9 October 2003) was an American contractor who disappeared in Iraq in 2003. His family was given a "presumption of death of a citizen abroad" certificate three years later. He has not been officially declared dead.

Early life
Von Ackermann was an intelligence officer in the United States Air Force, and had previously served as a Russian linguist in the United States Army. Among his roles in the Air Force was that of "former Deputy Director of Intelligence for NATO operations in Kosovo in 1999, where he had been decorated for operations behind enemy lines."

Disappearance
He was employed by Ultra Services of Istanbul, Turkey when he disappeared in Iraq on October 9, 2003. His car was found empty on a road between Kirkuk and Tikrit, with his equipment and $40,000 still inside. On December 14, 2003, his colleague, Ryan G. Manelick was gunned down just after leaving Camp Anaconda. The Major Procurement Fraud Unit (MPFU) at U.S. Army Criminal Investigation Command (USACIDC) is investigating.

The CID have not given a firm conclusion on when or where von Ackermann may have died, although these is a presumption that it may have happened on October 9, 2003, in a botched kidnapping attempt. They still, however, refuse to give out information on his case which is still "active." Von Ackermann's body was never found.

The Defense POW/MIA Accounting Agency lists Von Ackermann as one of five remaining missing servicemen or DOD contractors since the onset of Operation Desert Storm.

Personal life
Before going to Iraq, Von Ackermann was a manager at Siebel Systems, a business software company in San Mateo, California, and living in Moss Beach, California. He is survived by his wife, Megan, and three children.

See also
List of people who disappeared

References

External links
Death of a Contractor Dan Halpern, Rolling Stone, March 8, 2007
The Missing Man – blog with links to articles on Manelick & Von Ackermann

1960s births
2000s missing person cases
2003 deaths
American people of the Iraq War
American people taken hostage
Foreign hostages in Iraq
Missing person cases in Iraq
United States Air Force officers
United States Army officers